Ahmed Kara (born 22 March 1985) is an Algerian footballer who plays for MC El Eulma as a forward.

References

External links

1985 births
Living people
Association football forwards
Algerian footballers
MC El Eulma players
People from Guelma Province
21st-century Algerian people